Yogad is an Austronesian language spoken primarily in Echague, Isabela and other nearby towns in the province in northern Philippines.  The 1990 census claimed there were around 16,000 speakers.

Classification
Anthropologist H. Otley Beyer describes Yogad as a variant of Gaddang language and the people as a sub-group of the Gaddang people in his 1917 catalogue of Philippines ethnic groups. Glottolog presently groups it as a member of the Gaddangic group; in 2015, however, Ethnologue placed Yogad as a separate member of the Ibanagic language family.  Godfrey Lambrecht, CICM, also distinguished separately the peoples who spoke the two languages.

Alphabet
The Yogad alphabet has 21 letters composed of 16 consonants and 5 vowels.

References

 

Languages of Isabela (province)
Cagayan Valley languages